Silvio Fogel (July 8, 1949 – March 27, 2016) was an Argentine football player.

Fogel started his professional career with the Argentine club Rosario Central in 1971. He transferred to Primera División de México side Club de Fútbol Torreón in 1973. In 1974, he was transferred to Puebla FC, where he is still remembered as one of the best foreign players ever to play with the club. From 1974-1980 he managed to score 84 goals, placing himself second in the all-time goal-scoring list, just 3 behind Ricardo Alvarez who scored 87.

After he retired he kept a close relation with the clubs, doing numerous jobs inside the institution. He played in numerous commemorative veterans' games with Puebla FC.

Fogel lived  in the city of Puebla, where he opened an Argentina restaurant. He died on March 27, 2016 due to a heart attack.

Footnotes

External links
 Silvio Fogel at BDFA.com.ar 

1949 births
2016 deaths
Argentine footballers
Argentine expatriate footballers
Rosario Central footballers
Club Puebla players
Cruz Azul footballers
Liga MX players
Expatriate footballers in Mexico
Association football forwards
People from Corrientes
Sportspeople from Corrientes Province